The 2003 Samoa rugby union tour of Austral Africa was a series of matches played in July 2003 in Namibia and South Africa by Samoa national rugby union team, to prepare the 2003 Rugby World Cup.

The Samoans played three match against South African provincial teams and one test match against Namibia.

Namibia: Jurie Booysen, 14.Riaan van Wyk, 13.Du Preez Grobler, 12.Corne Powell (capt), 11.Melrick Afrika, 10.Emile Wessels, 9.Hakkies Husselman, 8.Kees Lensing, 7.Hugo Horn, 6.Niel du Toit, 5.Heino Senekal, 4.Wolfie Duvenhage, 3.Eben Isaacs , 2.Schalk van der Merwe, 1.Sean Furter,  – replacements: 16.Cor van Tonder, 17.Herman Lintvelt, 18.Jurgens van Lill, 19.Ronaldo Pedro , 20.Mot Schreuder, 21.Deon Mouton    –  No entry : 22.Johan Jenkins
Samoa: 15.Fa'atonu Fili, 14.Sailosi Tagicakibau, 13.Terry Fanolua, 12.Brian Lima, 11.Dom Feau'nati, 10.Earl Va'a, 9.Steve So'oialo, 8.Semo Sititi (capt), 7.Maurie Fa'asavalu, 6.Des Tuiali'i, 5.Leo Lafaiali'i, 4.Opeta Palepoi, 3.Jeremy Tomuli, 2.Jonathan Meredith, 1.Kas Lealamanu'a,  – replacements: 16.Denning Tyrell, 17.Mahonri Schwalger, 18.Tamato Leupolu , 19.Pama Petia, 20.Dale Rasmussen, 21.Gaolo Elisara

References

2003 rugby union tours
2003
2003 in African rugby union
2003
2003